The Tour of Ankara was a cycling race held in Turkey, as a 2.2-categorised race on the UCI Europe Tour, between 2015 and 2017.

Winners

References

Cycle races in Turkey
2015 establishments in Turkey
Recurring sporting events established in 2015
2017 disestablishments in Turkey
Recurring sporting events disestablished in 2017
UCI Europe Tour races
Spring (season) events in Turkey